Tibor Sóron (born 18 January 1993) is a Hungarian football player who currently plays for Bicskei TC.

Club statistics

Updated to games played as of 9 December 2014.

References

HLSZ

1993 births
Living people
People from Esztergom
Hungarian footballers
Association football forwards
Dunaújváros PASE players
FC Ajka players
Rákosmenti KSK players
Kaposvári Rákóczi FC players
III. Kerületi TUE footballers
Vác FC players
Szeged-Csanád Grosics Akadémia footballers
Nemzeti Bajnokság I players
Nemzeti Bajnokság II players
Sportspeople from Komárom-Esztergom County